Deh-e Milan (also Romanized as Deh-e Mīlān and Deh Mīlān; also known as Deh Mīlūn) is a village in Hotkan Rural District, in the Central District of Zarand County, Kerman Province, Iran. At the 2006 census, its population was 61, in 19 families.

References 

Populated places in Zarand County